New Era Building is a historic commercial and industrial building located at Lancaster, Lancaster County, Pennsylvania. It is a three-story, "L" shaped brick building in the Queen Anne style. The original section was built in 1890–1891. The rear section was expanded in 1900, 1903, and 1914, to accommodate the growing printing company. It originally housed the New Era newspaper and printing company. A number of notable academic journals and books were printed here between 1893 and 1922, including Popular Science Monthly. When listed in 1983, it was occupied by a Rite Aid drug store.

It was listed on the National Register of Historic Places in 1983.

References

Commercial buildings on the National Register of Historic Places in Pennsylvania
Queen Anne architecture in Pennsylvania
Commercial buildings completed in 1891
Buildings and structures in Lancaster, Pennsylvania
National Register of Historic Places in Lancaster, Pennsylvania